Han Duan (born 15 June 1983) is a Chinese football forward who last played for Los Angeles Sol of Women's Professional Soccer and was a member of the Chinese National Team.

Career 
Duan finished ninth with the Chinese team in the 2004 Athens Olympics, playing in two matches during group stage. In 2008 Beijing Olympics, Duan scored a goal for China in a group stage match, resulting in a 2-1 win over Sweden. During the 2009 Women's Professional Soccer season, Duan scored a total of 3 goals and had 2 assists with the Los Angeles Sol.

Duan announced her retirement from international soccer, in September 2011, after China failed to qualify for 2012 London Olympics.

Career statistics

Club career

International goals

See also 
 List of association women football players with 100 or more international goals

References

External links 
 
 Official homepage 
 NBC Olympics player profile 
 Los Angeles Sol player profile

1983 births
Living people
Chinese women's footballers
China women's international footballers
Footballers at the 2004 Summer Olympics
Footballers at the 2008 Summer Olympics
Olympic footballers of China
2003 FIFA Women's World Cup players
2007 FIFA Women's World Cup players
Expatriate women's soccer players in the United States
Chinese expatriate sportspeople in the United States
Los Angeles Sol players
FIFA Century Club
Footballers from Dalian
Women's association football forwards
Asian Games medalists in football
Footballers at the 2006 Asian Games
Asian Games bronze medalists for China
Medalists at the 2006 Asian Games
Women's Professional Soccer players